Berrington and Eye railway station was located in Eye, Herefordshire. It opened on 6 December 1853 and closed on 9 June 1958.  The station was opened under the Shrewsbury and Hereford Joint Railway and closed under the auspices of the Western Region of British Railways.  The former station is on the operating Welsh Marches Line.

References

Further reading

External links
 Berrington and Eye station on navigable 1954 O. S. map

Disused railway stations in Herefordshire
Former Shrewsbury and Hereford Railway stations
Railway stations in Great Britain opened in 1853
Railway stations in Great Britain closed in 1958